This is list of cemeteries in Turkey sorted after provinces.

Ankara
There are a total of 191 cemeteries within the metropolitan city limits of Ankara.

Cebeci Asri Cemetery: The cemetery for high-ranked public and military officials in Ankara
Turkish State Cemetery: Cemetery in Ankara reserved for presidents, prime ministers and high-ranked military officials fought at the Turkish War of Independence
Karşıyaka Cemetery: Largest public cemetery in Ankara

İstanbul
In Istanbul Province, there exist a total of 333 cemeteries, of which 268 are for Muslims and the remaining for non-Muslims like Christians of different denominations and Jews.

Aşiyan Asri Cemetery: Burial ground at Bosporus, where mostly renowned intellectuals, writers and artists rest
Edirnekapı Martyr's Cemetery: Military cemetery, where also high-ranked civil servants and renowned personalities are buried
Haydarpaşa Cemetery: Cemetery for British soldiers, who died during the Crimean War and British Commonwealth soldiers of the two World Wars
Eyüp Cemetery: one of the largest cemeteries of Istanbul hosting graves of Ottoman sultans and court members, grand viziers, high-ranked religious authorities, civil servants and commanders as well as intellectuals, scientists, artists and poets
Feriköy Cemetery, Muslim cemetery
Feriköy Protestant Cemetery, Istanbul: Christian cemetery in Istanbul dating back to 1858
Karacaahmet Cemetery: 700-year-old cemetery in Üsküdar
Merkezefendi Cemetery: 16th century burial ground in Zeytinburnu
Pangaltı Catholic Cemetery, Istanbul: The largest Roman Catholic Cemetery in Istanbul
Şişli Armenian Cemetery:  Armenian cemetery in the Şişli district of Istanbul, Turkey
Şişli Greek Orthodox Cemetery: Christian Orthodox cemetery, mostly consisting of Greek graves
Zincirlikuyu Cemetery: Istanbul's first modern structured cemetery located in Şişli
Ulus Ashkenazi Jewish Cemetery
Ulus Sephardi Jewish Cemetery

İzmir
The country's third biggest city has 267 cemeteries within the metropolitan city limits.

 Yeni Buca Cemetery
 Doğançay Cemetery
 Bornova Cemetery

Mersin
 Mersin Interfaith Cemetery

References

Turkey
 
Cemeteries